Native olive is a common name for several plants and may refer to:
Bursaria incana (Pittosporaceae)
Bursaria spinosa (Pittosporaceae)
Chionanthus ramiflorus (Oleaceae)
Notelaea ligustrina (Oleaceae)
Notelaea lloydii (Oleaceae)
Notelaea longlifolia (Oleaceae)
Notelaea microcarpa (Oleaceae)
Olea paniculata (Oleaceae)

See also
Wild olive